Watertown Municipal Airport  is a public use airport located in and owned by the city of Watertown, in Jefferson County, Wisconsin, United States. It is included in the Federal Aviation Administration (FAA) National Plan of Integrated Airport Systems for 2021–2025, in which it is categorized as a regional general aviation facility.

Although most U.S. airports use the same three-letter location identifier for the FAA and IATA, this airport is assigned RYV by the FAA but has no designation from the IATA.

Watertown Municipal Airport was the site of the first Transponder Landing System in the United States.

Facilities and aircraft 
It has two runways:

 Runway 5/23: 4,429 x 75 ft. (1,350 x 23 m.), surface: asphalt. Approved GPS and NDB approaches.
 Runway 11/29: 2,801 x 75 ft. (854 x 23 m.), surface: asphalt. Approved GPS approaches.

The ROCK RIVER (RYV) non-directional beacon, 371 kHz, is located on the field.

For the 12-month period ending May 24, 2021, the airport had 58,000 aircraft operations, an average of 159 per day: 89% general aviation, 9% air taxi and 2% military. In January 2023, there were 57 aircraft based at this airport: 49 single-engine, 7 multi-engine and 1 jet.

Aero park
There is an aero-park, sponsored by the local Marine League, located adjacent to the airport where air operations can be observed.

Gallery

See also 
 List of airports in Wisconsin

References

External links 
  at Wisconsin DOT Airport Directory
 Wisconsin Aviation, the fixed-base operator (FBO)
 

Airports in Wisconsin
Buildings and structures in Jefferson County, Wisconsin